Javad Heyat (25 May 1925 – 12 August 2014) was an Iranian surgeon and writer. He performed the first open heart surgery in Iran, and was Ayatollah Khamenei's personal physician when the latter was President of Iran in the 1980s. Heyat was the publisher and founding editor of Varliq, which he established in 1979 in Tehran. He was the recipient of numerous honorary degrees from universities in Turkey and the Republic of Azerbaijan.

Biography
Javad Heyat was born in 1925 in Tabriz, northwestern Iran, and belonged to an aristocratic Iranian Azerbaijani family. His father, Ali Heyat, was Chief Justice under the Pahlavi dynasty. Javad attended elementary and secondary school in Tabriz, and subsequently moved to the capital Tehran where he attended medical school. He then attended medical school abroad, first in Istanbul and then Paris in order to specialize in cardiology. Back in the Iranian capital Tehran, Heyat pursued a remarkable medical career at Hedayat hospital, where he performed the first open heart surgery in Iran. Javad Heyat was the author of over 80 articles in Persian and 20 articles in English and French for medical journals. Following the Islamic Revolution (1979), he became professor of surgery at Islamic Azad University in Tehran where he published three surgery manuals. He simoultaneously wrote several books on the history of and language of Iran's historic Azerbaijan region. In 1983, Heyat briefly moved to the United States in order to participate in the first Conference of Turkic studies at the University of Indiana. There, Heyat presented a paper which dealt with the Azeri Turkish language and literature, before and after the Revolution. Heyat was the recipient of numerous honorary degrees from universities in Turkey and the Republic of Azerbaijan: University of Medicine in Istanbul, Medical School of the Republic of Azerbaijan, Turkish Language Academy in Ankara, Academy of the Republic of Azerbaijan. He also was Ayatollah Khamenei's personal physician when the latter was President of Iran (1981–1989).

According to Gilles Riaux, Heyat was a "leading figure in the Iranian medical community", and a "recognized expert on Turkish affairs, in Ankara and elsewhere".

Criticism
Heyat was a pan-Turkist. He held a Turkish nationalistic position in his academic writings on history and literature.

References

Sources

Further reading
 Dr. Heyat CV, Iranian Society of Cardiovascular Surgeons

1925 births
2014 deaths
Physicians from Tabriz
Iranian journalists
Iranian surgeons
Iranian cardiac surgeons
20th-century Iranian physicians
Iranian expatriates in Turkey
Iranian expatriates in France
Academic staff of the Islamic Azad University
Iranian magazine founders
Pan-Turkists